Mayavaram Saraswathi Ammal (September 3, 1921 – August 17, 2013) was an Indian classical flautist.

References

Carnatic instrumentalists
Indian flautists
1921 births
2013 deaths
20th-century Indian musicians
20th-century flautists